Kenson may refer to:

River Kenson, a river of South Wales

Steve Kenson (born 1969), writer and designer of fantasy role-playing games and related fiction
Kenson Park, a neighborhood in Ottawa, Canada
Kenson Lee, visual artist and composer previously part of Wong Fu Productions